Manjil Virinja Pookkal is a 1980 Indian Malayalam-language romantic thriller film produced by Navodaya Appachan under Navodaya Studio and written and directed by Fazil. It stars Shankar, Mohanlal and Poornima Jayaram. The film features original songs composed by Jerry Amaldev and a score by Guna Singh, cinematography was done by Ashok Kumar.

In the film, Prem Kishan (Shankar) arrives at Kodaikanal, where he falls in love with a girl named Prabha (Poornima). But Prabha is already married to Narendran (Mohanlal), a sadistic youngster. Their life gets troublesome when Narendran finds out about their affair. Manjil Virinja Pookkal marks the onscreen debut of Mohanlal and Poornima, the Malayalam debut of Shankar, the directorial debut of Fazil, and Amaldev's debut as music director.

The film was shot extensively in and around Kodaikanal, Tamil Nadu. Manjil Virinja Pookkal was released in theatres on 25 December 1980 on Christmas day. Made for ₹7 lakh (₹0.7 million), the film grossed over ₹1 crore (₹10 million) at the box office. It became one of the highest-grossing Malayalam films of all time. In retrospect, the film is often regarded as the first new generation film in Malayalam cinema. Manjil Virinja Pookkal won six Kerala State Film Awards, including Best Film with Popular Appeal and Aesthetic Value and Best Actress for Poornima.

Plot 

The story is about Prem Krishnan (Shankar Panicker) coming to the hills of Kodaikanal on work, meeting and falling in love with Prabha (Poornima Jayaram) whom he knows little about. Later, he realises that she is married when her husband, Narendran (Mohanlal) comes into the picture. Narendran is a sadistic husband. The film ends with Prem Krishnan committing suicide by driving off the cliff after killing Narendran, saddened by the loss of Prabha, who was killed by Narendran.

Cast 

 Shankar as Prem Krishnan
 Mohanlal as Narendran
 Poornima Jayaram as Prabha
 Prathapachandran as Shivashankara Panicker
 Alummoodan as Kushalan
 Nedumudi Venu as Seythalavi

Production

Development 
Fazil was one of the members in the creative team of Navodaya Studio's story discussions for their productions. The discussion for Manjil Virinja Pookkal began right after the success of the studio's big-budget film Theekkadal starring high-profile actors like Madhu and Prem Nazir. During their discussion, Fazil suggested a low-budget film featuring newcomers. The project was greenlit and they hired Fazil himself as the director. Ashok Kumar was selected as the film's cinematographer; his name was suggested by a friend of Fazil. Fazil got the film's title from a chat he had with song lyricist Bichu Thirumala when they were in Alappuzha. Thirumala when returned after a morning walk told Fazil that he saw a flower bloomed in the snow. Fazil found it to be against the laws of nature for flowers to bloom in the snow because that would prevent spring from coming. He realised that his main characters Prabha and Prem Kishan too suffer the same fate, because spring does not come to their lives, and their love cannot bloom.

Casting 
Shankar was selected to portray Prem Kishan, the film was his debut in Malayalam cinema; he was already popular among the Tamil speaking audience through the film Oru Thalai Ragam (1980) which ran for 365 days in Tamil Nadu. For the role of Narendran, debutant Mohanlal was selected through an audition. A panel consisting Jijo Punnoose, Fazil, Sibi Malayil, and a director [unknown] was the judges for the screen-test. Sibi Malayil and the other director gave him only five and seven marks out of hundred displeased with his appearance, but Fazil and Punnoose awarded him 90 and 95 marks for his performance. He was ultimately chosen as the antagonist. Mohanlal donated his first salary of 2000 to an orphanage near the filming location. The film's second-unit director was Sibi Malayil. Poornima Jayaram made her debut in Malayalam with the film.

The studio hired the United States-based Jerry Amaldev as the music composer, who debuted with it. Amaldev was suggested to Fazil by Punnoose, Fazil recall that, "Jijo of Navodaya had made me listen to a song tuned by a new composer and I immediately liked its orchestration,...I had no idea who Jerry was, but was impressed when Jijo told me that he had assisted legendary composer Naushad in Mumbai. I decided to try him for my debut film, and that was how he became the music director of Manjil Virinja Pookkal".

Filming 
On the thought that "a movie that introduces a new face should be shot using a new camera", Appachan travelled to Germany for buying the "best camera available" at that time. The film was shot using the Arriflex 35 IIC camera. The filming took place mainly in and around Kodaikanal, Tamil Nadu. The first dialogue of Mohanlal, which begins as "Good Evening Mrs. Prabha Narendran" was shot close to the Astoria Hotel, near Kodaikanal bus-stand.

Soundtrack 

The evergreen hit songs of this movie was composed by Jerry Amaldev and penned by Bichu Thirumala.

The song Mizhiyoram was reused in the film Jan.E.Man.

Reception 
Manjil Virinja Pookkal was released on 25 December 1980, Christmas Day.

Critical response 
On 26 December 1980, The Indian Express wrote, "The director, Sri Fazil, a post-graduate student who has also contributed to the story and dialogue makes an impressive debut in this picture. His directorial touches are original, and he shows a definitive touch that could be the envy of veteran directors."

Box office 
The film was a slow starter but turned out to be a blockbuster and ran for more than 150 days in theatres. Made on a cost of ₹7 lakh (₹0.7 million), it grossed over ₹1 crore (₹10 million) at the box office, becoming one of the highest-grossing Malayalam films of the year. In an interview in 2010, Shankar told that he watched the film on its release day in a theatre in Thrissur, but "it didn't look like the film was going to be a hit than", and he was surprised by the response it got later. He realised the film was doing well from the comments of people when he was mobbed at the Bangalore Airport.

Accolades

Legacy 
Manjil Virinja Pookkal became a landmark film in Malayalam cinema. In retrospect, it is regarded as the first new generation film in Malayalam cinema. Shankar's symbolism before kissing, that is, moving his index finger from left chin to his upper lip and then downwards, was a rage among the youth. In the 2013 film Natholi Oru Cheriya Meenalla, throughout the film, Fahadh Faasil's character Prem interacts with the character Narendran in a virtual world. The song Mizhiyoram was reused in the 2021 film Jan.E.Man.

References

External links 
 

1980 directorial debut films
1980 films
Films scored by Jerry Amaldev
1980s Malayalam-language films
1980s romantic thriller films
Films directed by Fazil
Films produced by Navodaya Appachan
Films shot in Alappuzha
Films shot in Kodaikanal
Indian romantic thriller films